The Mangaung Prison is a privately managed prison in Bloemfontein, Free State, South Africa. The prison is managed by the company G4S as part of a consortium. The South African Department of Correctional Services signed a 25-year contract with the consortium in 2000. The prison can accommodate around 3,000 prisoners.

The prison was in the news in October 2013, after the department temporarily took over the prison. That September, 330 members of the Police and Prisons Civil Rights Union were fired after refusing to return to work after a strike. In October, a female custodian with 13 years of experience was taken hostage by prisoners. She was later saved unharmed by a special police task force.

Documentary
In 2019 the documentary 'Prison for profit' was published about problems and use of excessive force in the prison. Investigative journalist Ruth Hopkins has mentioned that the South African minister for correctional services S'bu Ndebele in 2013 would arrange an investigation which would be published within 30 days. The report was not yet released in 2019.

See also
 Brandvlei Correctional Centre
 Drakenstein Correctional Centre
 Kgosi Mampuru II Correctional Centre
 Pollsmoor Prison
 Moses Sithole serial killer
 Westville Prison
 Zonderwater Prison

References

Buildings and structures in Bloemfontein
Prisons in South Africa